Fasiplon (RU 33203) is a nonbenzodiazepine anxiolytic drug from the imidazopyrimidine family of drugs.

Fasiplon binds strongly to benzodiazepine sites on the GABAA receptor and has similar anxiolytic effects in animals, but with less sedative or muscle relaxant action. It was developed by a team at Roussel Uclaf in the 1990s

References

Sedatives
Imidazopyrimidines
Oxadiazoles
GABAA receptor positive allosteric modulators